La Forêt-Auvray is a former commune in the Orne department in north-western France. On 1 January 2016, it was merged into the new commune of Putanges-le-Lac.
It is located about 200 km west of Paris, 45 km south of Caen, 55 km north-west of Alençon.

See also
 Communes of the Orne department

References 

Foretauvray